Arnold of Bergen (died 1434) was bishop of Bergen, Norway, and a non-ordained, short-lived Archbishop of Uppsala, Sweden.

As Olaus Laurentii, in 1432, was elected by the Chapter to become Archbishop of Uppsala and Sweden, the King Eric of Pomerania expressed his displeasure that he had not been consulted. In response, he decided in 1433 while Olaus Laurentii was in Rome to be ordained that Arnold of Bergen should become Archbishop. Arnold moved into the bishop's palace in Uppsala causing a quarrel.

The quarrels were resolved by Arnold's death in 1434. The king then decided to accept Olaus Laurentii as Archbishop after all.

See also 
 Archbishop of Uppsala

References 
 Nordisk familjebok 

1434 deaths
15th-century Roman Catholic bishops in Norway
15th-century Roman Catholic bishops in Sweden
Year of birth unknown
Roman Catholic archbishops of Uppsala